Sanam is an Indian pop rock band formed in 2010  currently based in Mumbai, India known for its renditions of old classic Indian Bollywood songs as well as original music. The band SANAM consists of Sanam Puri (lead vocalist/composer), Samar Puri (lyricist/lead guitar/composer), Venky S or Venkat Subramaniyam (bass guitar) and Keshav Dhanraj. In 2016, the band was amongst India's top 10 independent YouTube Channels, India's biggest music artist on the digital platform and the fastest growing YouTube channel in the country.

The band was awarded the Best Music Content Creator (National Category) at the Social Media Summit & Awards in Amaravati in 2017 by AP Tourism Minister Bhuma Akhila Priya and MP Kesineni Srinivas.

Musical career

2010: Formation and first years

In 2003, Venky and Samar were batchmates in Indian School, Muscat, both of them played guitar and planned to start a band so they got Samar's younger brother, Sanam Puri in the band to join as a singer. After completing school, they all moved to India for college. Sanam & Samar moved to Delhi and got involved there in the college rock circuits . Sanam Puri started winning awards for his singing and Samar Puri started writing songs. Venky meanwhile, in Bangalore, took up bass playing with various bands. He sang a cappella in college and started performing swing/jazz and pop standards regularly at clubs. Venky met Keshav (who was the drummer in bands like Nerverek)through the college rock circuit and they formed an alternative rock outfit called ‘The Previous Band’. Venky used to travel to Chennai (where the band was based) write songs, rehearse and perform with them. Eventually 2 band members took off to M.I in LA for music education and another member went to SAE in Byron Bay. Thus ended their short stint of ‘The Previous Band’. In 2009, Samar and Sanam moved to Mumbai to pursue a music career. Keshav also took up a job with Furtados as their Brand manager for Zildjian, Evans and Pearl drums. Venky connected the three of them and they hit it off in Keshav's garage where they started writing music together. In May 2010, Times Music launched a nationwide pop band hunt called ‘Supastars’ for young talent in India. Samar Keshav & Sanam put in an entry randomly in the name of The SQS Project. Over 1600 bands across India took part in this contest. Venky joined them in the final round and amongst all the entries, The SQS Project won the title ‘Times Music Supastars’ and this is how the journey began. giving the band a name of ‘SQS Supastars’.

The band released their first self-titled album, Supastars, and later released music videos of their songs "Hawa Hawa" and "Behka". This project featured the work of major Swedish and Denmark music labels who handled the mixing and mastering of the album. The band also endorsed the ‘Mufti’ clothing line during their second music video "Behka".

2012: Formation of Sanam- the band and Growth Curve 

In 2012 the band met Ben Thomas (managing director, Kurian & Co Talent Management and a recognised music business manager who had managed careers of successful music artists including Sonu Nigam and Vishal–Shekhar), and based on his experience and knowledge of the Indian music industry paved the way forward for the band.

He also introduced the band to Vishal–Shekhar which led to Sanam Puri's first Bollywood break as a play back singer with songs like "Dhat Teri Ki" from the movie Gori Tere Pyaar Mein and "Ishq Bulaava" from Hasee Toh Phasee. The same year the band composed its first original composition "Main Hoon" for the Hollywood blockbuster The Amazing Spider-Man 2.

Given the growing following of the band digitally, in 2015, the band was recognised by YouTube and invited to perform at the YouTube FanFest  They were again invited in 2016.

The band performed in the capital Male at the VMY Music Festival in July 2015, which commemorated the 50th Anniversary of Independence of the Republic of Maldives. The Ballard Estate Festival in Mumbai was formally inaugurated by the chief guest Nitin Gadkari, Minister Of Road Transport and Highways Of India on 24 January, followed by the headlining performance by Sanam band. The event was attended by eminent personalities such as actress and politician Hema Malini.

In 2016 as a part of a property called Jammin, a digital musical collaboration featuring YouTube's best musical talent with four music composers A R Rahman, Salim–Sulaiman, Clinton Cerejo, and Mithoon, "Inquilab Mera Khwab" was released in collaboration with Clinton Cerejo and "Yaara" was released in collaboration with A R Rahman and all the other Artists who were a part of the program.

On 1 April 2017, music broadcaster Channel V announced the launch of its latest property ‘Only On V’, with an exclusive partnership with band Sanam. The band aims to spread love and happiness through their music and considers this opportunity one of their greatest achievements. Their endorsement of online retail giant eBay and its campaign #NoWorldwithoutWomen got a very good response. The band in 2017 did a series of concerts as a part of Pledge Tour with the objective of not just giving the audience a great time but also raise the issue of growing cases of Child Sexual Abuse in India in association with a Chennai-based NGO Justice & Hope.

In February 2018, Sanam was declared the artist of the month on MTV Beats for its new release "Sanam Mennu". MTV Beats the 24x7 Hindi Music TV Channel, through a series of specially curated shows under the concept of Month of love, featured SANAM Band in three of its shows. First two were "Spotlight: Dil Beats with Sanam Band" and "Love shots" which were all about love & romance and third was the kicking off episode of "Gaano Ka Rafu Centre 2.0" hosted by Sahil Khattar. In December 2018, SANAM band was featured on the cover of Rolling Stone Magazine.

Discography

Filmography

Studio albums

Compilation albums 

Singles

Sanam Puri's works

Filmography

Collaborations

Awards 

Winners of Times Music Supastars in 2010 as SQS Project.
 Best Music Content Creator- (National Category) at the Social Media Summit & Awards in Amravati in 2017 by AP Tourism Minister Bhuma Akhila Priya and MP Kesineni Srinivas.
Radio City Freedom Awards 2019 for their #SANAMOriginal song "ITNI DOOR" under Best Pop Artist (People's Choice) Category

References

Musical groups established in 2010
Musical quartets
2010 establishments in Maharashtra
Punjabi musical groups
Bengali musical groups
Indian human rights activists
Indian pop music groups
Indian boy bands
Indian rock music groups
52.https://theprint.in/opinion/pov/telegram-to-instagram-india-anti-vaxxer-group-is-growing/663610/